The Bay Shore Handicap is a discontinued Thoroughbred horse race run from 1925 through 1955 at Aqueduct Racetrack in Queens, New York City. The race was open to horses age three and older and run on dirt. From 1956 to 1959 there was no Bay Shore Handicap but in 1960 Aqueduct Racetrack created the Bay Shore Handicap/Stakes as a race for three-year-olds.

The 1940 race was won by Jacomar, recorded as being owned by Mrs. E. Graham Lewis. Better known as the highly successful cosmetics magnate Elizabeth Arden, she would establish Maine Chance Farm three years later and build it into one of the most successful breeding and racing operations of that era.

The 1943 and 1944 Bay Shore Handicap winners, Wait A Bit and Brownie, were two of the three horses involved in the only triple dead heat on record in a Thoroughbred stakes race when they joined Bossuet to win the 1944 Carter Handicap at Aqueduct Racetrack.

Records
Speed record: (at 7 furlongs)
1:22.40 - Wait A Bit (1943)

Most wins:
 No horse ever won this race more than once

Most wins by a jockey:
 3 - Eric Guerin (1944, 1949, 1952)

Most wins by a trainer:
 3 - James E. Fitzsimmons (1929, 1933, 1945)

Most wins by an owner:
 2 - Alfred G. Vanderbilt II (1949, 1952)
 2 - Belair Stud (1933, 1945)
 2 - Greentree Stable (1939, 1948)
 2 - Rancocas Stable (1925, 1927)
 2 - William L. Brann (1941, 1946)

Winners

References

Discontinued horse races in New York City
Open mile category horse races
Aqueduct Racetrack
Recurring sporting events established in 1925
Recurring sporting events disestablished in 1955